Marchienne may refer to:

R.O.C. de Charleroi-Marchienne, Royal Olympic Club de Charleroi-Marchienne is a Belgian football club from the city of Charleroi, Hainaut.
Marchienne-au-Pont, a section of the Belgian town of Charleroi within the Walloon region in the Province of Hainaut
Mont-sur-Marchienne, a section of the Belgian town of Charleroi within the Walloon region in the Province of Hainaut

People 
 Emile de Cartier de Marchienne (1871–1946), Belgian diplomat
 Fernande de Cartier de Marchienne (1872–1903), mother of Marguerite Yourcenar
 Louis de Cartier de Marchienne (1921–2013), Belgian businessman. He was managing director of the company Eternit in the sixties
 Jean-Louis de Cartier de Marchienne, Belgian businessman. He is a member of the board and Managing Director of Carta Mundi

See also 
Tilloy-lez-Marchiennes, a commune in the Nord department in northern France
Bruille-lez-Marchiennes, a commune in the Nord department in northern France
 Marchiennes Abbey, a French monastery located on the Scarpe in Marchiennes . It was founded around 630 by Adalbaud, duc de Douai